Júlíus Vífill Ingvarsson is a former Independence Party Member of Reykjavík City Council.

Education

1972 Graduated from highschool
1973-1976 Student of the College of Music
1976-1977 Student Reykjavík Academy of Singing and Vocal Arts 
1977 University of Music and Performing Arts, Vienna
1979 a law degree from the University of Iceland 
1979-1982 Conservatorio Giovanni Battista Martini in Bologna, Italy

1993 District Court Attorney

City Council
2010-2016 Member of the City Council, was also in the years 1999-2002 the Council 
2008-2010 Chairman of Planning Council, Council member 2010- 
2008-2010 chairman of Associated Icelandic Ports. an independently operated company owned by the city of Reykjavik Board and four other municipalities. Board member 2010 -
2008-2010 Chairman of Regional Cooperation in the capital. Committee member 2010 -  
2009 Chairman of the Jury in the competition for the redesign of the port of Reykjavik
2008-2010 chairman of the Chess Academy of Reykjavik, a private institution designed to further interest in chess in Reykjavík
2008-2010 Board  (Association Internationale Villes et Ports) 
2008-2010 Board Reykjavik Energy
2007-2010 Board Austurhöfn, the Reykjavik Art Museum
2007-2008 Chairman of the Board of Appeal Malbikunarstöðin hf. 
2007-2008 chairman of the center of Reykjavik 
2006-2008 chairman of the education council 
2006-2008 Member of the Culture and Tourist Board 
2002 The adhoc committee on the future musical Reykjavik 
1999-2002 City Council member 
1998-2002 Member of the Organising 
1998-2002 Member of the Cultural Committee

He resigned in the wake of the 2016 Panama Papers.

Community work
2009- (now) Board Mechanism Caring 
2003-2010 chairman of the Reykjavik Music Society  
2003-2007 Board (Commission) UNICEF 
1996-2006 Board Disappeared Association in Independence Nes- and Melahverfi 
1994 founding member of the Rotary Club of Reykjavik - Downtown 
1991-1993 Board (vice) Opera Workshop 
1988-1994 Board Anna K. Nordal trust, and organization that provides music scholarships
1988 Appointed by the Minister of Education to the Committee on the future operating situation in Iceland 
1986-1993 Chairman Vocal Fund opera department of the Icelandic actor 
In 1986-1991 Acting Council, the executive order in 1991 
1986-1989 Chairman of the opera department of the Icelandic actor 
1976-1977 Director Úlfljótr Law Review
1974-1975 Board member and editor Vaka Vaka's Monthly 
1974-1975 Chairman of the Nordic Council of Law NSJR

References

Year of birth missing (living people)
Living people
People named in the Panama Papers
Place of birth missing (living people)
Conservatorio Giovanni Battista Martini alumni
Júlíus Vífill Ingvarsson
Júlíus Vífill Ingvarsson